Brian D. Lesser is an American businessman who is the former CEO of Xandr.

Family and education
Born about 1975, Lesser was introduced to the advertising industry at an early age by his father, Michael S. "Mike" Lesser, who was chairman and CEO of Lowe Marschalk (later Lowe & Partners Inc.), then president of Ogilvy & Mather New York. Mike Lesser was also general manager of The November Group, the advertising arm of the Committee for the Re-Election of the President, formed solely to create an ad campaign for the 1972 United States presidential election; he was the inaugural lecturer, in September 2012, of Fairleigh Dickinson University's Politics on the Public Mind program.

Lesser received a BA in Political Science from the University of Pennsylvania in 1996, then earned an MBA from Columbia Business School in 2004. He resides in New Jersey with his wife and three children.

Career
In 2006, Lesser was vice president of 24/7 Media, then senior vice president of the Media Innovation Group, LLC (known as “The MIG”). In 2011, he founded Xaxis as a subsidiary of GroupM; he then became CEO of GroupM in November 2015, overseeing six media agencies.

In October 2017, Lesser was recruited by former GroupM client AT&T as CEO of Advertising and Analytics. In September 2018, Advertising and Analytics was renamed Xandr, and Lesser was appointed CEO.

In 2014, Lesser was named to the Ad Age's “40 Under 40” list and, in 2018, was recognized by AdWeek as "Executive of the Year".

See also
 GroupM
 WPP plc
 AT&T

References

External links
 "AT&T's Brian Lesser on the future of advertising"; CNBC; Cannes Lions International Festival of Creativity; June 20, 2018; Accessed August 9, 2019.

1970s births
Living people
American telecommunications industry businesspeople
American chief executives
Businesspeople from New Jersey
University of Pennsylvania alumni
Columbia Business School alumni
AT&T people